Bridgehampton is a station along the Montauk Branch of the Long Island Rail Road. It is located at Maple Lane and Butter Lane, in Bridgehampton, New York.

History 
Bridgehampton station opened in June 1870 for the Sag Harbor Branch, and was burned to the ground on July 6, 1884. Another station replaced it the same year, and on June 1, 1895 it began to serve the Montauk Extension. The Sag Harbor Branch was abandoned on May 3, 1939. The station was closed between 1958, and January 1959, and was razed in May 1964. In 1968, the station was replaced with a shelter, and a high-level platform was built in the late 1990s.

Station layout
The station has one six-car-long high-level side platform on the south side of the main track; a siding is on the north side of the main track.

References

External links 

 

Sag Harbor Branch; Part Two (Arrt's Arrchives)
Unofficial LIRR History Website
Babylon-Montauk Branch Stations
Current Bridgehampton Station (March 2000 Photo)
The LIRR 7PM Bridgehampton (YouTube)
Unofficial LIRR Photography Site
Bridgehampton Station

Long Island Rail Road stations in Suffolk County, New York
The Hamptons, New York
Railway stations in the United States opened in 1870
1870 establishments in New York (state)